Anti-fog agents, also known as anti-fogging agents and treatments, are chemicals that prevent the condensation of water in the form of small droplets on a surface which resemble fog. Anti-fog treatments were first developed by NASA during Project Gemini, and are now often used on transparent glass or plastic surfaces used in optical applications, such as the lenses and mirrors found in glasses, goggles, camera lenses, and binoculars. The treatments work by minimizing surface tension, resulting in a non-scattering film of water instead of single droplets. This works by altering the degree of wetting. Anti-fog treatments usually work either by application of a surfactant film, or by creating a hydrophilic surface.

Development
Anti-fog agents were initially developed by NASA during the Project Gemini, for use on helmet visors. During Gemini 9A, in June 1966, Astronaut Eugene A. Cernan tested NASA's first space suit, and discovered during the space walk that his helmet visor fogged, among other issues. Cernan's suit was tested using the Spacecraft 9 life support system after the flight, when it was discovered that a small patch of the visor treated with an anti-fog solution remained clear of condensation. Later Gemini flights all included the anti-fog solution, for application prior to the space walk occurring.

Application
Anti-fog agents are usually available as spray solutions, creams and gels, and wet wipes, while more resistant coatings are often applied during complex manufacturing processes. Anti-fog additives can also be added to plastics where they exude from the inside to the surface.

Agents
The following substances are used as anti-fog agents:

 Surfactants that minimize the surface tension of the water:
 Detergents such as shampoo, soap, or shaving cream applied as a solution and wiped off without rinsing
 Hydrophilic coatings that maximize the surface energy:
 Polymers and hydrogels:
 Gelatin
 Beeswax
 Colloids and nanoparticles:
 Titanium dioxide, becomes highly hydrophilic under UV light.

Home recipes
One method to prevent fogging is to apply a thin film of detergent, but this method is criticized because detergents are designed to be water-soluble and they cause smearing. Divers often use saliva, which is a commonly known and effective anti-fogging agent.

Uses

Underwater diving
A demister is a substance applied to transparent surfaces to stop them from becoming fogged with mist deposit, often referred to as fog. Scuba divers and Underwater Hockey players often spit into their masks and then wash the surface quickly with water to prevent mist buildup that can impair vision. Several products are commercially available such as Sea Drops that are generally more effective. New masks lenses still have silicone on them from the manufacturing process, so it is recommended to clean the lenses with an appropriate mask scrub, then rinse the mask and then apply a demister solution.

See also

 
 , for fogging artifacts in photography

References

Fog
Automotive accessories
Glass coating and surface modification
NASA spin-off technologies